Peter Giles (born 1939) is a British countertenor and writer of scientific books about countertenors. Giles began his career as a boy chorister in a traditional all-male choir in London. In the years from 1961 to 1966 his teacher was the celebrated countertenor John Whitworth.
He first was appointed as alto lay clerk at Ely Cathedral, then at Lichfield Cathedral, followed by Canterbury Cathedral, where he was senior lay clerk from 1978 until 1994.
During his career he had numerous performances as a soloist singer within the UK, but also in the US and in Canada. Occasionally he can be seen on TV with solo performances and readings.

He took additional lessons by Arthur Hewlett and specialised on 'Sinus Tone Control', a sound technique by Ernest George White, which puts special emphasis for singers on using the resonances in the head. In this method he gives lessons for speakers and singers as a professional voice teacher.

He performed with the male trio Canterbury Clerkes for 25 years. In 2000, he founded the mixed voice quintet Quodlibet, with which he made three albums. Besides that he plays the organ at different churches and conducts and coaches choirs.

Giles is also known for his publications on the subject of countertenor.

Discography

As part of the trio Canterbury Clerkes 
Six albums including
 Fill Your Glasses: Convivial English Glees 1986 (together with London Serpent Trio)

As part of the quintet Quodlibet 
 In These Delightful Pleasant Groves
 North & South
 Mixed Assortment

Readings of poetry 
 Choose Me, You English Words; Peter Giles reads Poems from Yesterday

Books 
 together with David Mallinder: The Counter Tenor, Ferederic Muller Limited, London 1982.  According to WorldCat, the book is held in 243 libraries. The books is now superseded by 
 The History and Technique of the Counter-Tenor: a study of the male high voice family, Scolar Press, Ashgate 1994 According to WorldCat, the book is held in 309 libraries 
 A Basic Countertenor Method for Teacher and Student (Kahn & Averill, London, 2005)

References

External links 
 Homepage of Peter Giles
 Homepage of the mixed quintet Quodlibet

 

1939 births
Living people
British performers of early music
English choral conductors
British male conductors (music)
English classical organists
British male organists
English male voice actors
English writers about music
English male non-fiction writers
21st-century British conductors (music)
21st-century organists
21st-century British male musicians
Male classical organists